Shobana Jeyasingh  (born 26 March 1957 in Chennai) is a British choreographer and founder of Shobana Jeyasingh Dance.

Shobana Jeyasingh has been creating dance works for 30 years. Born in Chennai, India, she currently lives and works in London. Her acclaimed, highly individual work has been witnessed in all kinds of venues, including theatres, outdoor and indoor sites and on film. Her work taps into both the intellectual and physical power of dance, and is rooted in her particular vision of culture and society.

Shobana’s work is often enriched by specially commissioned music composed by an array of contemporary composers — from Michael Nyman to beat-boxer Shlomo. Her collaborators have included filmmakers, mathematicians, digital designers, writers, animators, as well as lighting and set designers.

Shobana has also made a significant contribution to dance in the UK and internationally through her published writings, papers, panel presentations and broadcast interviews.

Work and awards
Jeyasingh has produced more than 50 dance works.

She states that her work is rooted in her experiences as a British Asian and explores the conflicts between diverse personal and cultural origins.  Her choreography draws upon various sources, including Ballet, Bharatnatyam and contemporary dance.

Jeyasingh  was appointed Member of the Order of the British Empire (MBE) in 1995 and Commander of the Order of the British Empire (CBE) in the 2020 New Year Honours, both for services to dance.

She holds an honorary MA from Surrey University, an honorary doctorate from De Montfort University, and is a research associate at Middlesex University’s Research Centre for the Performing arts.  In 2005 Jeyasingh was the recipient of a NESTA Dream Time Fellowship. In 2008 she was named Asian Woman of Achievement for her contribution to Britain’s cultural life.

Complete list of works

References

British choreographers
Indian emigrants to the United Kingdom
Commanders of the Order of the British Empire
1957 births
Living people
People from Chennai
Naturalised citizens of the United Kingdom